On the Run! or known as I'm Very Busy is the eighth studio album by Taiwanese singer Jay Chou, released on 1 November 2007 by JVR Music.

The album was nominated for five Golden Melody Awards and won Song of the Year, Best Composer, and Best Lyricist for "Blue and White Porcelain". The album also won an IFPI Hong Kong Top Sales Music Award for Top 10 Best Selling Mandarin Album of the Year.

The tracks, "Cowboy is Very Busy", "Rainbow", and "Sunshine Nerd", are listed at number 11, number 28, and number 59 respectively on the 2010s Hit FM Top 100 Singles of the Year chart.

Track listing

Awards

References

External links
  Jay Chou discography@JVR Music

2007 albums
Jay Chou albums
Sony Music Taiwan albums